Hampton–Ellis Farm, also known as William Beanis Hampton Farm and Jonah Ellis Farm, is a historic home and tobacco farm located near Bahama, Durham County, North Carolina. The farmhouse was built about 1900, as a one-story, three bay, center hall plan dwelling.  It was enlarged about 1922, with the addition of a kitchen ell,  The house features a one-story, hip-roofed front porch. Contributing outbuildings were include the wood shed, cannery, smokehouse, feed house, tenant house, tenant smokehouse, tenant woodshed, pack house, ordering/stripping house, and four tobacco barns.  With the exception of the ordering/stripping house and three of the tobacco barns, all the outbuildings were built about 1922.

It was listed on the National Register of Historic Places in 2011.

References

Tobacco buildings in the United States
Farms on the National Register of Historic Places in North Carolina
Houses completed in 1900
Houses in Durham County, North Carolina
National Register of Historic Places in Durham County, North Carolina